Double Happiness is the eleventh studio album by Australian singer Jimmy Barnes. It was released on 18 July 2005 on CD and vinyl. The album contains duets Barnes performed with various solo artists and bands.

Track listing

 "Sit on My Knee" (with Dallas Crane) (Dallas Crane)
 "Gonna Take Some Time" (with Mahalia Barnes) (Jade MacRae, Mahalia Barnes)
 "Attention" (with Roachford) (Andrew Roachford, Jimmy Barnes, Mark Lizotte)
 "Run" (with Mica Paris) (Gerry DeVeaux, Mark Lizotte)
 "What Will They Say" (with John Swan) (Darren Dowlut, Dennis Dowlut)
 "Out of Time" (Rolling Stones cover; with Tim Rogers) (Mick Jagger, Keith Richards)
 "Got You as a Friend" (with Diesel) (Dave Derby, Mark Lizotte)
 "Resurrection Shuffle" (with The Living End) (Tony Ashton)
 "Piece of My Heart" (with Tina Harrod) (Bert Berns, Jerry Ragovoy)
 "Wichita Lineman" (Glen Campbell cover; with David Campbell) (Jimmy Webb)
 "Same Woman" (with Jackie Barnes) (G. Cunningham, Jimmy Barnes)
 "Say It Ain't So" (with Rahsaan Patterson) (J. Rogers, Jimmy Barnes, R. Patterson)
 "I'll Be There" (Jackson 5 cover; with Elly-May Barnes) (Berry Gordy Jr., Bob West, Hal Davis, Willie M Hutchinson)
 "Higher" (with Gary Pinto) (Gary Pinto, Mark Lizotte)
 "Settle For Me" (with EJ Barnes) (EJ Barnes)
 "Bird on the Wire" (Leonard Cohen cover; with Troy Cassar-Daley and Bella)
 "Shout" (Isley Brothers cover; with Billy Thorpe)

Chart positions

Weekly charts

Year-end charts

Certifications

Personnel

 Kenny Aronoff – drums
 Kristian Attard – bass guitar
 Andrew Bain – French horn
 Jackie Barnes – percussion, congas
 Andrew Bickers – saxophone
 Dario Bortolin – bass guitar, acoustic guitar
 Mark Browne – bass guitar
 Harry Brus – bass guitar
 Clayton Doley – organ, piano
 Lachlan Doley – keyboards
 Clare Brassil – cello
 Mitch Farmer – drums
 Ben Gurton – trombone
 Todd Hardy – trumpet
 Michael Hegerty – bass guitar
 Marcus Holden – violin
 Adrian Keating – violin
 Andrea Keeble – violin
 Mark Kennedy – drums
 Stewart Kirwan – trumpet
 Angela Lindsay – viola
 Margaret Lindsay – cello
 Mark Lizotte – guitar, bass guitar, drums, Hammond organ, clavinet, xylophone
 Shelley Jamison – viola
 Lee Maloney – drums
 Lawrie Minson – pedal steel guitar, mandolin
 Ian Moss – guitar
 Roachford – organ, piano
 Stephanie Sarka – violin
 Philip Sayce – guitar
 Yak Sherrit – drums
 Danny Spencer – guitar
 Paul Thorne – trumpet, flugelhorn
 Matthew Tomkins – violin
 Warren Trout – drums
 Richie Vez – bass guitar, percussion

See also
 List of number-one albums of 2005 (Australia)

References

2005 albums
Jimmy Barnes albums
Vocal duet albums